Shur Ab-e Hezareh (also Romanized as Shūr Āb-e Hezāreh, Shūrāb-e Hezāreh, and Shūrāb Hezāreh; also known as Shūrāb) is a village in Lak Rural District, Serishabad District, Qorveh County, Kurdistan Province, Iran. At the 2006 census, its population was 309, in 61 families. The village is populated by Kurds.

References 

Towns and villages in Qorveh County
Kurdish settlements in Kurdistan Province